Lot 51 is a township in Kings County, Prince Edward Island, Canada.  It is part of St. George's Parish. Lot 51 was awarded to John Pringle in the 1767 land lottery.

References

51
Geography of Kings County, Prince Edward Island